The Evangelical Lutheran Church of Brazil (IELB) is a Lutheran church, which was founded in 1904 in Rio Grande do Sul, a southern state in Brazil.

The IELB is a conservative, confessional Lutheran synod that holds to the Book of Concord. It started as a mission of the Lutheran Church–Missouri Synod and was the Brazilian District of that body. The IELB became an independent church body in 1980. It has about 243,093 members. The IELB is a member of the International Lutheran Council.

References

External links

International Lutheran Council members
Protestantism in Brazil
Lutheranism in South America
Lutheran Church–Missouri Synod